The Alley Cat is a 1929 British-German silent drama film directed by Hans Steinhoff and starring Mabel Poulton, Jack Trevor and Clifford McLaglen. The film was made as a co-production between the British company British & Foreign and the German Orplid-Film. Its German title was Nachtgestalten. The film was shot in Britain, partly on location in London. It was based on a novel by Anthony Carlyle.

Cast
Mabel Poulton as Polly
Jack Trevor as Jimmy Rice
Clifford McLaglen as Simon Beck
Shayle Gardner as inspector Fordham
Margit Manstad as Melona Miller
Marie Ault as Ma

References

Bibliography

External links

1929 drama films
British drama films
German drama films
Films directed by Hans Steinhoff
British silent feature films
British black-and-white films
German black-and-white films
Films based on British novels
Films set in London
German silent feature films
1920s British films
Silent drama films
1920s German films